Neopachygaster caucasica is a species of soldier fly in the family Stratiomyidae.

Distribution
Azerbaijan.

References

Stratiomyidae
Insects described in 2004
Diptera of Asia
Endemic fauna of Azerbaijan